Kinkalidia is a genus of grasshoppers in the subfamily Cyrtacanthacridinae with species found in Africa.

Species 

The following species are recognised in the genus Kinkalidia:

 Kinkalidia matilei Donskoff, 2000
 Kinkalidia robusta Sjöstedt, 1931

References 

Acrididae
Orthoptera genera